Golden Tour is the third concert tour by American singer-songwriter Romeo Santos, to support of his third studio album, Golden (2017). The tour kick off on February 15, 2018, at the Madison Square Garden in New York and ended on February 9, 2019, in San Juan, Puerto Rico. The tour receive positive reviews by the critics which praised the production and the artist charisma. Golden Tour was box office success visiting Europe, North America and Latin America with a total attendance of more than one million fans. It the highest-grossing concert tours of that year, crowning the singer as the number one selling Latin artist in the United States.

In some cities, due the high demand more dates was adedd. The first leg in the United States was sold out enterly and a second North American leg was announced. The North America first leg was opened and supporte by Karen Rodriguez, Victoria La Mala, Mr. Paradise and Dominican urban star Mozart La Para.

Overview

Critical Repcetion 
The tour was praise by the media. Richy Rosario from Billboard went to the New York concert at the Madison and wrote  [Romeo's] ability to keep viewers on the edge of their seats is overwhelmingly tangible, as his flawless vocals span for over two hours... It's his prowess on stage and expert musicianship that have made him this generation's bachata legend.” Suzette Fernandez attedent to the Miami concert and wrote "Santos delivered an awe-inspiring set in a nearly three-hour spectacle that included many surprises, kiss battles and a display of his sense of humor".

Latin times published and article titled "6 Reasons Why You Should Go To Bachata King's Concert" and stated "Attending a Romeo concert is really an experience that you have to live. Not only because of the good Latin vibe that is felt in the environment, but also because of the lights and scenery, plus the opportunity to enjoy him singing completely live".Music connection reviewed the concert at the Forum, Inglewood, and wrote "the bachata superstar Romeo Santos mesmerized his loyal fans with many of his hits songs old and new".

Tour dates

Box Office Data

References 

2018 concert tours
2019 concert tours